Kooning is a surname. Notable people with the surname include:

 Willem de Kooning (1904–1997), Dutch American artist 
 Elaine de Kooning (1918–1989), American artist